The 2017 Rio Open was a professional men's tennis tournament played on outdoor clay courts. It was the 4th edition of the tournament, and part of the ATP World Tour 500 series of the 2017 ATP World Tour. It took place in Rio de Janeiro, Brazil between 20 February and 26 February 2017. The women's tournament was discontinued starting this year.

Points and prize money

Point distribution

Prize money 

1 Qualifiers prize money is also the Round of 32 prize money
* per team

Singles main-draw entrants

Seeds 

 1 Rankings as of February 13, 2017.

Other entrants 
The following players received wildcards into the main draw:
  Casper Ruud
  João Souza 
  Janko Tipsarević

The following players received entry from the qualifying draw:
  Roberto Carballés Baena
  Marco Cecchinato
  Arthur De Greef
  Nicolás Kicker

The following player received entry as a lucky loser:
  Víctor Estrella Burgos

Withdrawals 
Before the tournament
  Gerald Melzer (illness) →replaced by  Víctor Estrella Burgos

Doubles main-draw entrants

Seeds 

 1 Rankings as of February 6, 2017.

Other entrants 
The following pairs received wildcards into the main draw:
  Thomaz Bellucci /  Thiago Monteiro
  Fabrício Neis /  João Souza

The following pair received entry from the qualifying draw:
  Facundo Bagnis /  Gastão Elias

Champions

Singles 

  Dominic Thiem def.  Pablo Carreño Busta 7–5, 6–4

Doubles 

  Pablo Carreño Busta /  Pablo Cuevas def.  Juan Sebastián Cabal /  Robert Farah, 6–4, 5–7, [10–8]

References

External links 
 Official website

Rio de Janeiro Open
2017
Rio Open